Mallinger is a surname. Notable people with the surname include:

John Mallinger (born 1979), American golfer
Mathilde Mallinger (1847–1920), Croatian opera singer
Pat Mallinger (born 1964), American musician, composer, and bandleader

See also
Gallinger
Mallinder